People Will Talk is a 1935 American comedy film directed by Alfred Santell and written by Herbert Fields. The film stars Charlie Ruggles, Mary Boland, Leila Hyams, Dean Jagger, Ruthelma Stevens, and Cecil Cunningham. The film was released on May 24, 1935, by Paramount Pictures.

Plot

Cast
Charlie Ruggles as Henry Wilton
Mary Boland as Clarice Wilton
Leila Hyams as Peggy Trask 
Dean Jagger as Bill Trask
Ruthelma Stevens as Doris McBride
Cecil Cunningham as Nellie Simpson
Stanley Andrews as Willis McBride
Constantine Romanoff as Prettyboy Plotsky
Hans Steinke as Strangler Martin
Edward Brophy as Pete Ranse
Sarah Edwards as Martie Beemish
 John Rogers as Spider Murphy

References

External links
 

1935 films
1930s English-language films
American comedy films
1935 comedy films
Paramount Pictures films
Films directed by Alfred Santell
American black-and-white films
1930s American films